Tomka and his friends is a 1977 Albanian drama film directed by Xhanfise Keko. The film stars Enea Zheku as Tomka, the leader of a group of boys fighting Nazis. The movie was mostly shot in the city of Berat, Albania.

Plot 

Tomka is a boy who likes playing football with his friends. When the German army captures his town, the German soldiers establish their camp in the town stadium. Tomka with help from his friends and their parents organizes sabotage actions against the soldiers.

External links 
Tomka dhe shokët e tij at IMDb

1977 films
Albanian-language films
Films directed by Xhanfise Keko
1977 drama films
Albanian drama films
Albanian World War II films